Amir El-Masry (born 2 August 1990) is an Egyptian-British actor. He won a Scottish BAFTA for his performance in the film Limbo (2020) and was nominated for a British Independent Film Award. He was named a 2020 BAFTA Breakthrough Brit and a 2021 Screen International Star of Tomorrow.

El-Masry debuted in the Egyptian comedy Ramadan Mabrouk Abu El Alamein Hamouda (2008), for which he was awarded Best Movie Debut at the Egyptian Cinema Oscar Festival.

Early life and education
El-Masry was born in Cairo, Egypt and brought up in Acton, West London. He attended Tower House School and the Harrodian School. He went on to graduate with a Bachelor of Science in Criminology and Sociology from Royal Holloway, University of London. After interning at a law firm, he trained at the London Academy of Music and Dramatic Art (LAMDA), graduating in 2013.

Career
After a conversation with actor Omar Sharif while his father was on a business trip, El-Masry met a screenwriter at a screening of Hassan and Marcus and made his debut in the Egyptian comedy films Ramadan Mabrouk Abu El Alamein Hamouda as Ramzy and El-Talatah Yishtaghaloonha as Nabil. For the former, El-Masry was awarded Best Movie Debut at the 2009 Egyptian Cinema Oscar Festival. He took time out of his first year at Royal Holloway to be in the latter.

After graduating from LAMDA, El-Masry first appeared on British television in a 2013 episode of the medical soap opera Casualty as Naveed. The following year, he made his Hollywood debut as Alireza in Jon Stewart's Rosewater. He had guest roles in the internationally co-produced Transporter: The Series and the FX series Tyrant, and appeared in the BBC Three pilot Rude Boys.

El-Masry received praise for his performance as Youssef in the 2016 BBC One miniseries The Night Manager. This was followed by 2017 roles in the Channel 4 serial The State and the independent film Lost in London. That same year, El-Masry made his professional stage debut in the Royal Court Theatre production of Goats and appeared in the Danish series Herrens Veje.

In 2018, El-Masry played Dante in the BBC One drama Age Before Beauty and had a recurring role as Ibrahim in Tom Clancy's Jack Ryan on Amazon Prime. He starred in the film Shoot. The following year, he played Kazem in the Egyptian series El-Brinseesa Beesa and Commander Trach in Star Wars: The Rise of Skywalker.

El-Masry starred as refugee Omar in Ben Sharrock's Limbo. For his performance, he won Best Actor in a Film at the 2021 British Academy Scotland Awards. He was also nominated for a British Independent Film Award (BIFA) and a Chlotrudis Award, and appeared on end-of-year lists from Peter Bradshaw of The Guardian and The Playlist. El-Masry had television roles in the first series of the BBC One and HBO series Industry as Usman Abboud in 2020 and the Netflix science fiction series The One as Ben Naser in 2021.

El-Masry has been cast as a young Mohamed Al-Fayed in the fifth season of the Netflix Royal Family drama The Crown. He also has  a recurring role in the BBC World War II drama SAS: Rogue Heroes and Jessica Hausner's Club Zero.

Personal life
El-Masry lives in Acton, London. He is Muslim. During lockdown, El-Masry helped to launch MENA Arts UK.

Filmography

Film

Television

Video games

Stage

Audio

Awards and nominations

References

External links 
 
 Amir El-Masry at Independent Talent

Living people
1990 births
21st-century English male actors
English Muslims
Egyptian Muslims
Egyptian emigrants to England
English male film actors
Egyptian male film actors
English male television actors
Male actors from Cairo
Male actors from London
People from Acton, London
People from Ealing